Puya cristata is a species in the genus Puya. This species is endemic to Bolivia.

References

cristata
Flora of Bolivia